is a Japanese manga artist who does mainly shojo manga. Her works are primarily serialized in Margaret magazine, with series published in collected volumes by Shueisha, though she has also been featured in fellow Shueisha publication Ribon, as well as illustrating the novel adaptation of her own Stepping on Roses series in Cobalt.

In 2014, Rinko Ueda would release two new titles, the series "Maria no Shiro" and a one-shot titled "Hoikumen!".

Bibliography
(1989)  
(1989)  
(1989)  
(1990)  ; adapted into an OVA by Madhouse in 1993
(1993)  
(1996)  
(2000)  
(2001)  
(2002)  ; English translation: Tail of the Moon Prequel: The Other Hanzo(u) (2009)
(2002)  ; English translation: Tail of the Moon (2006)
(2008)  ; English translation: Stepping on Roses (2010)
(2009)  
(2011) 
(2012)  
(2013)  
(2014)  
(2014)  
(2014)  
(-) Himitsu no juliet

Notes

References

1970 births
Living people
Manga artists from Nara Prefecture